Guards Division may refer to one of the following.

 Imperial Guard (Japan)
1st Guards Division (Imperial Japanese Army)
2nd Guards Division (Imperial Japanese Army)
3rd Guards Division (Imperial Japanese Army)
Germany, during World War I:
 Guards Cavalry Division (German Empire)
 1st Guards Infantry Division (German Empire)
 2nd Guards Infantry Division (German Empire)
 3rd Guards Infantry Division (German Empire)
 4th Guards Infantry Division (German Empire)
 5th Guards Infantry Division (German Empire)
 1st Guards Reserve Division (German Empire)
 2nd Guards Reserve Division (German Empire) 
 Guard Ersatz Division (German Empire)
Russia:
 Russian Imperial Guard
 1st Guard Cavalry division (Russian Empire)
 2nd Guard Cavalry division (Russian Empire)
 1st Guards Infantry Division (Russian Empire)
 3rd Guard Infantry Division (Russian Empire)
 Guards unit, of the USSR and post-Soviet states
United Kingdom:
 Guards Division of the present-day British Army administrative formation
 Guards Division (United Kingdom) of the British Army in World War I and briefly at the end of World War II
 Guards Armoured Division of the British Army in World War II